Trinity Episcopal Church may refer to various buildings and their congregations in the United States:

Alabama
 Trinity Episcopal Church (Mobile, Alabama), 1845, the first large Gothic Revival church built in Alabama

Arkansas
 Trinity Episcopal Church (Pine Bluff, Arkansas), 1866, also known as St. John's Parish
 Trinity Episcopal Church (Searcy, Arkansas), 1902

California
 Trinity Episcopal Church (Santa Barbara, California), 1866

Delaware
 Trinity Episcopal Church (Wilmington, Delaware), 1890

District of Columbia
 Trinity Episcopal Church (Washington, D.C.), 1851, razed in 1936

Florida
 Trinity Episcopal Church (Apalachicola, Florida), 1839, originally known as Christ Church
 Trinity Episcopal Church (Melrose, Florida), 1886, an historic Carpenter Gothic Episcopal church
 Trinity Parish (St. Augustine, Florida), 1834, the oldest Protestant church in Florida

Georgia
 Trinity Episcopal Church (Columbus, Georgia), 1891

Idaho
 Trinity Episcopal Church (Gooding, Idaho), 1907, on the National Register of Historic Places listings in Idaho
 Trinity Episcopal Church (Pocatello, Idaho), 1987

Illinois
 Trinity Episcopal Church (Wheaton, Illinois), 1881, a historical Gothic Revival Episcopal church

Indiana
 Trinity Episcopal Church (Bloomington, Indiana), 1905, a church in the Episcopal Diocese of Indianapolis
 Trinity Episcopal Church (Connersville, Indiana), 1859, deconsecrated 2017
 Trinity Episcopal Church (Fort Wayne, Indiana), 1865

Iowa
 Trinity Episcopal Church (Iowa City, Iowa), 1871
 Trinity Episcopal Church (Muscatine, Iowa), 1854
 Trinity Episcopal Church (Ottumwa, Iowa), 1985, in the Fifth Street Bluff Historic District

Kansas
 Trinity Episcopal Church (Atchison, Kansas), 1866

Kentucky
 Trinity Episcopal Church (Covington, Kentucky), 1857
 Trinity Episcopal Church (Danville, Kentucky), 1830
 Trinity Episcopal Church (Owensboro, Kentucky)

Louisiana
 Trinity Episcopal Church (Cheyneyville, Louisiana), 1860

Massachusetts
 Trinity Episcopal Church (Lenox, Massachusetts), 1888
 Trinity Episcopal Church (Melrose, Massachusetts), 1886

Maine
 Trinity Episcopal Church (Lewiston, Maine), 1879

Michigan
 Trinity Episcopal Church (Caro, Michigan), 1881
 Trinity Episcopal Church (Detroit), 1890
 Trinity Episcopal Church (Houghton, Michigan), 1910

Minnesota
 Trinity Episcopal Church (Litchfield, Minnesota), 1871
 Trinity Episcopal Church (St. Charles, Minnesota), 1874
 Trinity Episcopal Church (Stockton, Minnesota), 1859

Mississippi
 Trinity Episcopal Church (Hattiesburg, Mississippi), 1912

Missouri
 Trinity Episcopal Church (Independence, Missouri), 1881
 Trinity Episcopal Church (Kirksville, Missouri), 1917
 Trinity Episcopal Church (St. Louis, Missouri), 1885, moved 1910

New Jersey
 Trinity Episcopal Church (Woodbridge, New Jersey), c. 1717

New York
 Trinity Episcopal Church (Ashland, New York), 1879
 Trinity Episcopal Church (Buffalo, New York), 1886
 Trinity Episcopal Church (Claverack, New York), 1901
 Trinity Episcopal Church-Fairfield, Fairfield, New York, 1808
 Trinity Church (Manhattan), 1839-46, on Broadway near Wall Street, also known as Trinity Episcopal Church
 Trinity Episcopal Church Complex (Mount Vernon, New York), 1857
 Trinity Episcopal Church (Potsdam, New York), 1835
 Trinity Episcopal Church Complex (Saugerties, New York), 1831
 Trinity Episcopal Church (Syracuse, New York), 1914, now known as the Faith by Love Church
 Trinity Episcopal Church and Parish House (Watertown, New York), 1889

North Carolina
 Trinity Episcopal Church (Chocowinity, North Carolina), 1826
 Trinity Episcopal Church (Mount Airy, North Carolina), 1896
 Trinity Episcopal Church (Scotland Neck, North Carolina), 1855

Ohio
 Trinity Episcopal Church (Columbus, Ohio), 1866
 Trinity Episcopal Church (McArthur, Ohio), 1882
 Trinity Episcopal Church (Toledo, Ohio), 1863

Oregon
 Trinity Episcopal Church (Ashland, Oregon), 1894
 Trinity Episcopal Cathedral (Portland, Oregon), 1906
 Trinity Episcopal Church (Bend, Oregon), 1929

Pennsylvania
 Old Trinity Church (Episcopal), 1711, in what was Oxford Township, now Philadelphia, Pennsylvania
 Trinity Episcopal Church (Williamsport, Pennsylvania),1875

Rhode Island
 Trinity Church (Newport, Rhode Island), 1726

South Carolina
 Trinity Episcopal Church and Cemetery, Abbeville, South Carolina, 1860
 Trinity Episcopal Church (Charleston County, South Carolina), 1876, on Edisto Island
 Trinity Episcopal Cathedral (Columbia, South Carolina), 1847, formerly Trinity Episcopal Church

South Dakota
 Trinity Episcopal Church (Groton, South Dakota), 1884

Tennessee
 Trinity Episcopal Church (Clarksville, Tennessee), 1875
 Trinity Episcopal Church (Winchester, Tennessee), 1872

Texas
 Trinity Episcopal Church (Houston), 1919

Virginia
 Trinity Episcopal Church (Portsmouth, Virginia), 1830
 Trinity Episcopal Church (Staunton, Virginia), 1855

Washington
 Trinity Parish Episcopal Church (Seattle), 1902

West Virginia
 Trinity Episcopal Church (Parkersburg, West Virginia), 1878

Wisconsin
 Trinity Episcopal Church (Oshkosh, Wisconsin), 1887

See also
 Trinity Church (disambiguation)
 Trinity Episcopal Cathedral (disambiguation)
 Trinity Memorial Episcopal Church (disambiguation)
 Trinity Methodist Church (disambiguation)
 Trinity Methodist Episcopal Church (disambiguation)
 Trinity Protestant Episcopal Church (disambiguation)